Hugh Miller Thompson (June 5, 1830 – November 18, 1902) was the second Bishop of Mississippi.

Biography
Thompson was born on June 5, 1830, in Derry, Ireland however he emigrated to the United States with his parents when he was 6 years old. He trained for the priesthood in Nashotah House and was ordained deacon on June 6, 1852, and priest on August 31, 1856. Between 1860 and 1870, he served as professor of ecclesiastical history at Nashotah House. He also spent some time as the editor of the American Churchman. Between 1871 and 1872 he was rector of St James' Church in Chicago and later became rector of Christ Church in New York City. In 1876 he moved south to serve as rector of Trinity Church in New Orleans. Thompson was elected bishop coadjutor of Mississippi and was consecrated on February 24, 1883. He became Mississippi's diocesan bishop upon Bishop Green's death on February 13, 1887. Thompson remained Mississippi's diocesan bishop until his death November 18, 1902.

References

External links
 
Bibliographic directory from Project Canterbury

1830 births
1903 deaths
American Episcopal priests
19th-century American Episcopalians
Episcopal bishops of Mississippi
19th-century American clergy